Emmanouil "Manolis" Prekas (born 28 February 1996) is a Greek water polo player, who is a member of Greece men's national water polo team. He plays for Greek powerhouse Olympiacos, with whom he won the 2017–18 LEN Champions League, 2 Greek Championships and 1 Greek Cup.

References

Greek male water polo players
Olympiacos Water Polo Club players
Living people
Place of birth missing (living people)
1996 births
Water polo players from Athens
21st-century Greek people